The 1989 Tipperary Senior Hurling Championship was the 99th staging of the Tipperary Senior Hurling Championship since its establishment by the Tipperary County Board in 1887. The championship ran from 17 September to 22 October 1989.

Loughmore-Castleiney entered the championship as the defending champions, however, they were beaten by Clonoulty-Rossmore in the quarter-finals.

The final was played on 22 October 1989 at Semple Stadium in Thurles, between Clonoulty-Rossmore and Holycross-Ballycahill, in what was their first ever meeting in the final. Clonoulty-Rossmore won the match by 1-11 to 1-09 to claim their second championship title overall and a first title in 101 years.

Lorrha's Kevin Hough was the championship's top scorer with 1-15.

Qualification

Results

Quarter-finals

Semi-finals

Final

Championship statistics

Top scorers

Top scorer overall

Top scorers in a single game

Miscellaneous
Clonoulty-Rossmore won the title for the first time since 1988. The gap of 101 years was the longest between titles.

References

Tipperary
Tipperary Senior Hurling Championship